Olga Kudrashova (born 1978 in Zelenodolsk, Russia) is a Belarusian biathlete. She represented Belarus at the 2010 Winter Olympics in Vancouver, Canada.

References

External links

1978 births
Belarusian female biathletes
Olympic biathletes of Belarus
Biathletes at the 2010 Winter Olympics
Living people